Federico Pizarro may refer to:

 Federico Pizarro (footballer) (1927–2003), Argentine footballer
 Federico Pizarro (handballer) (born 1986), Argentine handball player